José Joaquín Martínez Sieso (born 13 April 1956) is a Spanish politician and former President of Cantabria between 1995 and 2003.

References

1956 births
Leaders of political parties in Spain
Living people
Presidents of Cantabria
People's Party (Spain) politicians